Ṣọ̀pọ̀na (or Shapona) is the god of smallpox in the Yoruba religion. The Yoruba people took their traditions about Shapona to the New World when they were transported in the slave trade. He has become known as Babalú-Ayé, among many other names, in the Orisha religion that developed in the Americas.

Within the traditional religion of the Yoruba people of Nigeria, smallpox was believed to be a disease foisted upon humans due to Shapona’s “divine displeasure.” Formal worship of the god of smallpox was highly controlled by specific priests in charge of shrines to the god. Prior to the early 20th century, people of this religion believed that if the priests were angered, they were capable of causing smallpox outbreaks through their intimate relationship with Shapona. The name "Sapona" (alt. Shapona, Saponna, etc.) is considered a secret and taboo name, not to be spoken aloud in respect for the power of the Lord of Infectious Disease. For this reason, the deity has a number of other names and titles which have been in use since the pre-modern period, such as Omolu.

Sapona is the traditional, sacred and protected name of the Orisha popularly known as Babalú-Ayé or Omolu. Speaking his true name is avoided so as to not invoke the power of disease.

Dr. Oguntola Sapara suspected that the priests were deliberately spreading the disease, and surreptitiously joined the cult. He discovered that the priests were causing the disease through applying scrapings of the skin rash of smallpox cases. Based on this information, the British colonial rulers banned the worship of Shapona in 1907. Worship continues, however, with the faithful paying homage to the god even after such activities were prohibited.

Dahomey religion
In Dahomean religion Sopono is known as Sakpata, Shakpana or similarly Sopono. He is the divinity of the earth, wellness, smallpox, and can heal or inflict both insanity and disease on humans.

Candomblé
Sopona is known in the Afro-Brazilian tradition of Candomblé as Sakpata or Sakpata-Omolu in the (Jejé nation). He is associated with the colors red, black, and white, as in Africa. Insects associated with him are Sakpata-Omolu beetles, black butterflies, flies, and mosquitoes. A skirt and hood made of straw that covers the entire body is the clothing associated with Sakpata-Omolu followers and worship. In the Jejé tradition, Kpo and Loko are also associated with straw clothing. The xaxará, a broom with palm or straw bristles, is used in Sakpata-Omolu rituals. Small gourds, white cowry shells, a black necklace (laguidibá) are all accessories associated with Sakpata-Omolu. He is seen to have both the power to inflict and cure skin disease and other contagious diseases. In present times this includes HIV/AIDS.

Trinidad Orisha

In the Trinidad Orisha tradition, Sopona is known as Shakpana, and is similarly a ferocious god associated with healing smallpox. In a survey of Orisha shrines on Trinidad, James Houk found that flags to Ogun are found in almost every location. Those to Shakpana and Osain (Osanyin) closely follow in popularity.

References

Literature
Bader, Richard-Ernst: Sopono, Pocken und Pockengottkult der Yoruba. Erster Teil. Medizinhistorisches Journal 20 (1985) 363-390 (German)
Bader, Richard-Ernst: Sopono, Pocken und Pockengottkult der Yoruba. Zweiter Teil. Medizinhistorisches Journal 21 (1986) 31-91 (German)
Idowu, E. Bolaji. 1962. Olodumare: God in Yoruba Belief. London: Longmans, Green, and Co.
McKenzie, Peter. 1997. Hail Orisha! A Phenomenology of a West African Religion in the Mid-Nineteenth Century. Leiden, the Netherlands: Brill.

Yoruba deities
Yoruba gods
Health gods
Smallpox deities
Plague gods